Tony Benson is the name of 

 Tony Benson (athlete) (born 1942), Australian long-distance runner 
 Tony Benson (rugby league) (born 1965), New Zealand rugby league coach